Six Months in Mexico is a book by Nellie Bly that she wrote after her travels through Mexico in about 1885. She took the initiative to work as a foreign correspondent at the age of 21. At that point she had been writing for the newspaper The Dispatch, but had become dissatisfied with having to write for the women's pages.

In the book she describes the lives and customs of the people of Mexico and the poverty of the common people. She was struck by the widespread addiction to playing the lottery, noting that people would even pawn their clothes in order to buy tickets. She also described courtship, wedding ceremonies, the popularity of tobacco smoking, the legend of the maguey plant from which pulque and mezcal were made, and the habits of the soldiers, including an early mention of their marijuana use: 

Bly returned to the United States after her reporting on the imprisonment of a journalist by dictator Porfirio Díaz put her in danger of imprisonment herself.

Bly later wrote a second travel book, Around the World in 72 Days, telling the story of her circumnavigation of the globe by ship and train.

References

External links

 Six Months in Mexico at the Hathi Trust digital library
 

1888 non-fiction books
1880s in Mexico
Books about Mexico
American travel books
1885 in Mexico